Shahdara may refer to:
Shahdara Bagh, Punjab, Pakistan
Shahdara district, Delhi, India